The ,  or  ("complaint, vexation") is a genre of lyric poetry practised by the troubadours. The word "" appears frequently in such works.

He finds the genre continued in later medieval Catalan, Italian, French, and Galician-Portuguese literature. Ernest Wilkins considered William Shakespeare's Sonnet LXVI an example of an English , citing also example from Petrarch.

Sources
Chambers, Frank M. An Introduction to Old Provençal Versification. Diane, 1985. .
Hill, Raymond Thompson. "The Enueg", Periodical of the Modern Languages Association, 27 (1912), pp. 265–96.
Hill, Raymond Thompson. "The Enueg and Plazer in Medieval French and Italian", Periodical of the Modern Languages Association, 30 (1915), pp. 42–63.
Levin, Richard. "A Second English Enueg", Philological Quarterly, 53:3 (1974:Summer), pp. 428–30.
Wilkins, Ernest. "The Enueg in Petrarch and Shakespeare", MP, 13 (1915), pp. 495–96. 

Western medieval lyric forms
Occitan literary genres